Giovanni Battista Deti (1580–1630) was a Roman Catholic cardinal.

Biography
On 24 Jun 1623, he was consecrated bishop by Ottavio Bandini, Cardinal-Bishop of Palestrina, with Alfonso Gonzaga, Titular Archbishop of Rhodus, and Federico Baldissera Bartolomeo Cornaro, Bishop of Bergamo, serving as co-consecrators.

References

1580 births
1630 deaths
17th-century Italian cardinals
Religious leaders from Ferrara